David Clements Fulton (February 1, 1838March 30, 1899) was an American banker and politician.  He was the 16th mayor of Hudson, Wisconsin, and represented St. Croix County in the Wisconsin State Assembly during the 1873 session.  During the first administration of President Grover Cleveland, he served as United States marshal for the Western District of Wisconsin.  He also served as a Union Army officer during the American Civil War.

Background 
Fulton was born in Bethel, New York, on February 1, 1838, second son of Mr. and Mrs. James M. Fulton. He received an academic education, and in 1854 accompanied his family when they moved to Hudson, where his father went into the mercantile business on a large scale. His father died March 30, 1858, leaving his business to David and his brother Marcus, who would serve in the Wisconsin State Senate. David described himself in the Wisconsin Blue Book as "engaged in general business" and a "speculator", and mentioned that he dealt in real estate.

Civil War 
Fulton raised a company of volunteers for the Union Army from St. Croix County, and in July 1862 was commissioned a captain commanding Company D of the 30th Wisconsin Infantry Regiment. He was on duty with the company as it was assigned to various posts, first in Wisconsin and subsequently to Fort Sully in Dakota Territory, until October 14 of 1864, when Fulton was commissioned as a major of the 1st Wisconsin Heavy Artillery Regiment He was on duty with his new regiment in Virginia through the end of the Civil War. He mustered out June 26, 1865.

Elected office 
Fulton held various offices in the government of Hudson, including one term as mayor, member of the St. Croix County Board of Supervisors, member of the school board, and alderman. In 1872 he was elected for a one-year term representing the St. Croix County district of the Assembly as a Liberal Republican, with 1,432 votes to 1,132 for regular Republican B. C. B. Foster (Republican incumbent John C. Spooner was not a candidate). He was assigned to the standing committees on the militia and on engrossed bills

He did not seek re-election in 1874, and was succeeded by Republican Harvey Clapp.

Later life 
After his term in the Assembly, Fulton served six years as a manager of the National Homes for Disabled Soldiers, and was a United States Marshal for Western Wisconsin during the first Cleveland administration. He was Cashier and later President of the First National Bank of Hudson, and President of the Board of Trustees of the St. Croix County Asylum; he held the latter two offices at the time of his death.

The Fulton brothers continued the family business together until the 1892 death of Marcus, when the businesses were divided, leaving David to his own personal interests. He died on March 30, 1899, in Chicago, where he had gone to visit his son Marcus.

References 

1838 births
1899 deaths
Businesspeople from Wisconsin
Members of the Wisconsin State Assembly
People from Hudson, Wisconsin
People from Bethel, New York
Union Army officers
Wisconsin Liberal Republicans
Mayors of places in Wisconsin
Wisconsin city council members
County supervisors in Wisconsin
School board members in Wisconsin
United States Marshals
American bankers
People of Wisconsin in the American Civil War
19th-century American businesspeople
American people of Scottish descent